Jim Clancy may refer to:

 Jim Clancy (baseball) (born 1955), former Major League Baseball pitcher 
 Jim Clancy (journalist), former journalist for CNN
 Jim Clancy (Ghost Whisperer), a character from the U.S. television show Ghost Whisperer

See also
 James Clancy (disambiguation)